The Shire of Winton is a local government area in Central West Queensland, Australia. Its administrative centre is located in the town of Winton. It is named after Winton, Dorset, England, the birthplace of Robert Allen, the first white settler in the Winton (Queensland) area.

The major industry in the shire is beef production and some opal mining.  There has been some development of the known oil and gas reserves in the region.

History 

The Winton Division was created on 23 September 1886 under the Divisional Boards Act 1879.

With the passage of the Local Authorities Act 1902, Winton Division became the Shire of Winton on 31 March 1903.

It subsequently lost an area in its northwest to the Shire of McKinlay on 24 July 1930.

Towns and localities 
The Shire of Winton includes the following settlements:

 Winton
 Collingwood (ghost town)
 Corfield
 Middleton
 Opalton

Amenities 
Winton Shire Council operates a public library at Winton.

Chairmen and mayors
Initially, the chairman/mayor was chosen by the elected councillors from among themselves. Later, it became a separate role elected by the public.
The chairmen and mayors of the Winton Divisional Board and the Winton Shire Council include: 
 1887–1889 J. B. Riley
 1889–1890 Robert Christian Ramsay
 1890–1891 M. F. Ramsay
 1891–1898 A. G. Fraser
 1898–1901 Robert Christian Ramsay (2nd term)
 1901-1901 William Henry Corfield
 1901–1903 Robert Logan Chirnside
 1903–1907 Robert Christian Ramsay (3rd term)
 1907–1910 Arthur Douglas Ramsay 
 1910–1912  W. H. Cameron
 1913–1920 Andrew John Baxter McMaster
 1920–1921 Robert Edward Jackson
 1921–1924 Andrew John Baxter McMaster (2nd term)
 1924–1927 Leonard Irving 
 1927–1930 Percy Neil Grieve
 1930–1934 John Rupert Wilfred Kennedy
 1934–1946 Thomas Joseph Shanahan
 1946–1955 Edward Charles Pender Phillott
 1955–1958 Walter de Levante Booty
 1958–1964 Edward Charles Pender Phillott (2nd term)
 1964–1976 Charles Kempson Maxwell
 1976–1981 William Joseph Harold Holmes
 1981–1987 Eric Barton Bryce
 1987–1995 Erice Muir Lenton
 1995–2007  S. B. (Bruce) Collins 
 2008–2012 Edward Lawrence (Ed) Warren 
2012–2017 Graham Thomas (Butch) Lenton (died in office)
 2017–present: Gavin John Baskett

In the 2008 election, the two candidates Ed Lawrence and Butch Lenton received the same number of votes. The winner, Ed Lawrence, was decided by drawing a name from a hat.

In the 2016 election Butch Lenton was elected unopposed. He died in office on 1 October 2017 in Winton, which resulted in a by-election. He was posthumously named as one of the Queensland Greats by Queensland Premier Annastacia Palaszczuk in a ceremony at the Queensland Art Gallery on 8 June 2018.

Population

References

Further reading

External links
 

 
Local government areas of Queensland
1886 establishments in Australia